Chuang Wei-lun (born 17 March 1982) is a Taiwanese football player who currently plays for Tatung F.C. and the Chinese Taipei national football team. He is fit either as a striker or as a midfielder. When he played for Tatung F.C., he was voted the best right winger in the Chinese Taipei National Football League 2005 season. 

On February 9, 2007, Grulla Morioka of Japanese Tohoku League announced Chuang's transfer in their official site. He became the second Taiwanese male player to join a Japanese professional football club, following goalkeeper Lu Kun-chi. Grulla Morioka had a formal press conference for them on March 4, 2007, in which Chuang expressed his desire to help the team for promotion. However, on March 13, the official site of Grulla Morioka reported that Chuang returned to Taiwan before contracting with the club due to family affair.  

Afterward, Chuang returned to Tatung.

References

1982 births
Living people
Taiwanese footballers
Tatung F.C. players
Chinese Taipei international footballers
Association football forwards
Association football midfielders